Aleksandr Samoilovich Figner (Alexandre Figner) (1787—1813) was a Guards colonel of the army of the Russian Empire, known as the organizer of partisan units during the 1812 Napoleonic invasion of Russia and later of Germany. After the Russian army left Moscow after the battle of Borodino, he received permission to act independently as a partisan. He entered the city and committed sabotage there. According to some stories, he even planned to kill Napoleon. After that, he gathered a detachment of lagging soldiers and deserters and began to attack the retreating units of the Grande Armée. His detachment became a notable force and participated in the capture of the General Augereau brigade near Lyakhovo. Figner managed to create a resounding glory for himself, becoming the most famous partisan leader at that time. He was distinguished by a passion for dressing up for reconnaissance among enemy units. During the War of the Sixth Coalition, he was sent to Danzig for espionage and agitation among the local population. He was distinguished by cruelty towards captured French, unusual even among the partisans of that time. Another famous partisan, Denis Davydov, severely criticized him for this. Figner often gave prisoners to the peasants for laceration and liked to kill prisoners himself with his favorite air gun. But he tried to use captured Spaniards and Italians for his own purposes.  During the Truce of Pläswitz he formed from them the so-called "Vengeful Legion" with the help of which he hoped to overthrow the king of Italy or Westphalia. After the retreating of the main forces he tried to wage his own war in Westphalia (he hoped to provoke an uprising of the local population against the French). But he was defeated, and the units recruited from the prisoners showed themselves poorly. He came to his death swimming over the Elbe, while trying to break an encirclement by Napoleonic troops at Dessau.

It is believed that he could be one of the prototypes of Fedor Dolokhov, a partisan leader in Leo Tolstoy's War and Peace, although the count Fyodor Ivanovich Tolstoy, also known as the "American", is considered a more likely candidate.

References

1787 births
1813 deaths
Russian commanders of the Napoleonic Wars
Russian military personnel of the Napoleonic Wars
War and Peace